Suhaag ( Marriage) is a 1994 Indian Hindi-language action film directed by Kuku Kohli starring Ajay Devgn, Akshay Kumar Karishma Kapoor, Nagma in lead roles. Suhaag was one of the highest-grossing Bollywood films of 1994 and was the first film where actors Ajay Devgn and Akshay Kumar shared screen space. It was after a decade that the duo went on to appear in Khakee (2004) and then in Insan (2005) the very next year.

Plot 

The story is about Ajay Sharma and Raj Sinha who are best friends studying in the same college. Pooja and Madhu are their respective girlfriends. Raj is from a rich family. He stays with his uncle as his father lives in another town. Ajay Sharma lives in Bombay with his widowed mother Asha. Raj treats Ajay's mother as his own mother and they share a brotherly relationship. After graduating from college, Raj's maternal uncle asks Ajay to bring his birth certificate so that he can make his passport and find work for him in Canada. Ajay goes home to look for his birth certificate and finds out that his real name is Ajay Malhotra and his father, Dr. Ravi Malhotra, is still alive, serving a life sentence in prison for stealing a patient's organs. Ajay questions his mother and finds out that his father was framed by the hospital owner, Rai Bahadur. Upon discovering the truth, Raj and Ajay go to fight Rai Bahadur & release his father. In the course of their investigation, it is revealed that Raj's father whose name is Dr. Sanjay Sinha also a key member of the Rai Bahadur's hospital & was involved in framing Ajay's father. Rai Bahadur counterattacks by killing Raj's father before he could go to court. Then Raj and Ajay bring the corpse of Dr. Sanjay Sinha in the courtroom just before the deadline of time of the case. They create an illusion that Dr. Sanjay Sinha is still alive and by that, they made a corpse pointing a finger at Rai Bahadur. Angry Rai tries to shoots at him into the court. Then Ajay and Raj throw him off the building in which he dies.

Cast
Ajay Devgn as Ajay Malhotra
Akshay Kumar as Raj Sinha
Karishma Kapoor as Pooja
Nagma as Madhu
Aruna Irani as Asha Malhotra
Dalip Tahil as Dr. Sinha
Suresh Oberoi as Rai Bahadur
Adi Irani as Dr. Jagdish
Romesh Sharma as Dr. Ravi Malhotra
Tiku Talsania as Publisher
Gufi Paintal as Raj's Maternal Uncle
Jack Gaud as Rai Bahadur's Henchman

Box office 

According to Boxoffice-India, Suhaag grossed 12.15 crore and was a hit. It was also the seventh highest grossing Bollywood film of 1994.

Soundtrack
The album was one of the best selling albums of 1994. Lyrics authored by Sameer. The song "Tere Liye Jaanam" song is heavily inspired by the song "Roja Janeman" (Kaadhal Rojave in Tamil) from the critically acclaimed-movie Roja (1992).

References

External links 
 

1994 films
1990s Hindi-language films
Films scored by Anand–Milind
Films about organ trafficking
1994 action thriller films
1990s action drama films
Indian action thriller films
Indian action drama films
1990s masala films
1994 drama films
Films directed by Kuku Kohli